Gender/Sexuality Rights Association Taiwan (G/STRAT) was established in May 1999 in Taiwan. It aims to promote rights of sexual minorities in the aspects of family, education system, politics, economy and law.

It had protested the "Measures Governing the Rating Systems of Publications and Pre-recorded Video Programs" in Taiwan, supported the "Gin Gin's" gay bookstore when it was accused "offenses against morals", and presented Asian Lesbian Film and Video Festival in August 2005. Wang Ping is currently the Secretary-general.

In 2004, it won International Gay and Lesbian Human Rights Commission's (IGLHRC) Felipa de Souza Award.

See also

LGBT rights in Taiwan
List of LGBT rights organizations
Taiwan Pride

External links
Gender/Sexuality Rights Association Taiwan (English alternative provided. Requires Flash).

LGBT political advocacy groups in Taiwan
1999 establishments in Taiwan
Organizations established in 1999